ACF Investment Bank is a global media and entertainment investment bank founded in 2010. It specializes in buying, selling, fundraising, securitization, and pre/post deal services for businesses, IP holders and brands in the media and entertainment industry. ACF is headquartered in London and regulated by the UK Financial Conduct Authority and the US Financial Industry Regulatory Authority.

History 
ACF was co-founded in 2010 by Thomas Dey, who was previously a full equity partner at Grant Thornton, and Richard Gray, who was previously a director at Grant Thornton.

Business 
ACF is headquartered in London and has offices in Los Angeles. It is regulated by the UK Financial Conduct Authority and the US Financial Industry Regulatory Authority. ACF specializes in buying, selling, fundraising, securitization, and pre/post deal services for businesses, IP holders and brands in the media and entertainment industry.

References 

Investment banking
Investment banks
Television industry